Nürburgring 1 is an arcade game developed by Dr. Reiner Foerst and released in 1976. It was first demonstrated at the German IMA show in Spring 1976. It is recognized as the world's earliest first-person racing video game and inspired the development of Night Driver.

Gameplay 
The game's arcade cabinet contained a steering wheel, shifter, pedals, and other controls in the form of buttons. The player drove along a twisting roadway bordered by white guardrails. The lower portion of the screen showed the speedometer, mileage and other indicators.

The game counted crashes and punished them with a time penalty. The game ended after 90 seconds, or by driving across the finish line.

Development 
The game was created by Dr. Foerst not out of a desire to develop a video game, but in order to make a working driving simulation. Unable to find a way to cheaply scale down the earliest driving simulators by Volkswagen and BP, he decided to build one based on the technology he found inside a Pong video game machine. The resulting arcade game had no CPU, and instead used 28 separate circuit boards.

The game Night Driver was inspired when the lead programmer, Dave Shepperd, saw a picture of the arcade cabinet in a flyer that had a small portion of the screen visible. As Atari was much better at miniaturizing the game idea to a single board, they ultimately capitalized on most of the would-be success of Nürburgring 1 and caused it to become obscure and largely unknown.

Sequels 
Several other versions of the game were created. The second installment in the series had motorcycle handlebars, while the third was in full color with selectable backgrounds. Other versions of the third game in the series had cabinets that swiveled back and forth on a turntable, as well as banked back and forth.

References 

1976 video games
Racing video games
Arcade video games
Arcade-only video games
Video games developed in Germany
Single-player video games